Pat Jarvis is the name of:

Pat Jarvis (rugby league) (born 1957), rugby league footballer
Pat Jarvis (baseball) (born 1941), Major League Baseball player